In the context of the U.S. state of Maryland, Maryland 222 may refer to:
The portion of U.S. Route 222 in Maryland
Maryland Route 222, a state highway